Joanne Persico is the winningest coach at any sport at St. John's University with 540 career wins. She is an American collegiate volleyball coach and former collegiate volleyball player. In 1987, she was named Big East Player of the Year. Since 1994, she has been the women's volleyball head coach at St. John's University in New York City, now an NCAA Division 1 team. In 2006 and 2018, she was named the Big East Coach of the Year. Persico has tallied 540 career victories and six BIG EAST titles throughout her 29 seasons as head coach. Her total is the 23rd most by any active Division I women's volleyball coach. She is the fifth longest tenured women's volleyball coach at a single program and has tallied the seventh most wins among those coaches.

Biography

Early life and education 
A native of Bellerose, New York, Persico played volleyball at her elementary school, St. Gregory the Great Catholic Academy. She later played volleyball for St. Francis Preparatory School. and for the Big Apple Volleyball 18-and-under club team.

Persico attended Syracuse University. In 1987, she was named Big East Player of the Year during her senior year. After starting a career in sales at Cablevision on Long Island and Liberty Mutual in Manhattan, she was hired in 1994 to coach the newly formed St. John’s volleyball team.

Coaching career 
Persico was named Big East Coach of the Year in 2006 and 2018. She has led St. John's to six Big East Conference Championships and three NCAA Tournament appearances. Persico has racked up 540 all-time victories at the helm of the Red Storm volleyball program.

On August 27, Persico won her 527th match as a head coach as her Red Storm defeated Appalachain State in five sets. With the win, the Bellerose, New York native passed legendary St. John's men's basketball coach Lou Carnesecca for the most wins of any coach at St. John's University. She is the winningest female coach at the university all-time. Persico is the most winningest BIG EAST women's volleyball coach at a singular program in history. Among all active BIG EAST coaches, Persico has the most career wins and the most at their current institution.

Persico helped St. John's capture its sixth conference title after securing first place in the BIG EAST's East Division during the spring 2021 season. She also helped coach the program's fourth-ever BIG EAST Player of the year in Rachele Rastelli. Rastelli was named the  2021 BIG EAST Co-Player of the Year after taking the country by storm finishing in the top 50 in foru different statistical categories. Persico recruited her to play for the Red Storm from Parma, Italy. Rastelli joins Efrosini Alexakou, Hui Ping Huang and Wioleta Leszczynska as the only Johnnies to ever earn the conference's top honor.

Persico and the Red Storm earned an automatic bid to the 2019 NCAA Tournament, marking the program's third-ever appearance.  In 2019, Persico helped St. John's capture the BIG EAST Tournament Championship after entering the tournament as the fourth overall seed. The Red Storm swept then-No. 10 Creighton in the opening round, before defeating then-No. 12 Marquette to become the first fourth seed to win the title since the conference's reconfiguration in 2013.

References 

American volleyball coaches
Syracuse University alumni
St. Francis Preparatory School alumni
Living people
Syracuse Orange women's volleyball players
1966 births